Abdoulaye Traoré (born 13 August 1970) is a Malian footballer. He played in ten matches for the Mali national football team from 1993 to 1995. He was also named in Mali's squad for the 1994 African Cup of Nations tournament.

References

External links
 

1970 births
Living people
Malian footballers
Mali international footballers
1994 African Cup of Nations players
Place of birth missing (living people)
Association football midfielders
21st-century Malian people